Adam Schnelting is a Republican member of the Missouri House of Representatives. He represents the 104th district, which encompasses portions of St. Peters and St. Charles in St. Charles County, south of Mexico Road and extending southeastward beyond Route 94 to Towers Road. Schnelting was elected to the Missouri House in November 2018.

Early life, education and career

Schnelting is a licensed realtor, minister, and former church planter. He currently serves as a combat engineer in the Missouri Army National Guard. Schnelting is a former member of the Missouri State Defense Force and State Guard Association of the United States and is also actively involved with the National Rifle Association, Missouri Right to Life, and American Center for Law and Justice. Schnelting, whose family came to America in 1628, is a 7th generation Missourian and a member of the National Society of the Sons of the American Revolution. He obtained his degree in Christian Ministry from Oklahoma Wesleyan University and has an Associate of Arts degree with an emphasis in Political Science from State Fair Community College. Schnelting currently resides in St. Charles with his wife, Christine, and their children, Catherine and George.

Politics
Schnelting previously worked as a legislative assistant in the Missouri House of Representatives. In 2016, he ran in the Republican primary for the 65th house district, though lost to Tom Hannegan. Republican incumbent Kathie Conway was term-limited in 2018 from serving again in the 104th district. Schnelting ran unopposed in the August 2018 primary, then defeated Democrat Peggy Sherwin in the November general election. Schnelting received nearly 12,000 votes and won against Democratic candidate Jessica DeVoto in 2020. Due to state redistricting, Schnelting was moved to District 69, where he once again faced opponent Jessica DeVoto in the 2022 election, defeating her for a second time by an even larger margin than in 2020.

Schnelting introduced HJR116, an amendment to the Missouri state constitution authorizing the creation of the Missouri Department of the National Guard, during the 2022 legislative session. The amendment was approved by Missouri voters in the 2022 general election. The amendment authorizes the creation of the Missouri Department of the National Guard. Prior to the amendment, the Missouri National Guard was a part of the state's Department of Public Safety.

Schnelting also authored, introduced, and passed Missouri's abortion ban. His amendment to HB126 was a "trigger law" designed to go into effect if Roe v. Wade was ever overturned by the US Supreme Court. When the court struck down Roe v. Wade on June 24, 2022, the state ban on abortion went into effect.

Legislative assignments
Representative Schnelting serves on the following committees:
 Special Committee on Homeland Security, Chair
 Emerging Issues
 Insurance Policy

Electoral history

References

21st-century American politicians
Living people
Republican Party members of the Missouri House of Representatives
Oklahoma Wesleyan University alumni
People from St. Charles, Missouri
Year of birth missing (living people)